Pain out of proportion or pain out of proportion to physical examination is a medical sign where apparent pain in the individual does not correspond to other signs. It is found in a number of conditions, including:
Necrotizing fasciitis
Compartment syndrome
Mesenteric ischemia
Mueller-Weiss disease

References 

Medical terminology